This is a list of years in South Korean television.

Twenty-first century

Twentieth century

See also 
 List of years in South Korea
 Lists of South Korean films
 List of years in television

Television
Television in South Korea by year
South Korean television